The Clothing and Allied Trades Union of Australia  (CATU) was an Australian trade union which existed between 1907 and 1992. The CATU represented workers employed in the manufacture of clothing and manchester goods, including pressers, cutters and machinists. Approximately 85 percent of the union's membership was female.

Formation 

The CATU was originally formed in 1907 as the Federated Clothing Trades of the Commonwealth of Australia. The union was created through the merger of a large number of small state- and craft-based trade unions which had been active in Australia since the mid-nineteenth century, including the Cutters and Trimmers Union of New South Wales and the Tailors' Trade Protection Society. These unions primarily represented skilled, male craftsmen in what was already a largely female industry. This created an ongoing tension within the CATU between the need to represent the whole of the workforce within the industry, and the greater level of organisation and distinction within some male-dominated trade occupations.

Amalgamation 

During the 1970s and 80s the removal of tariff protections for manufactured goods in Australia, automation of production processes, and an increase in the availability of cheap imports from Asia greatly reduced the size of the workforce in the Australian clothing industry. This, combined with a policy of union rationalisation pursued by the ACTU, put pressure on the CATU to effect a merger with other unions in the apparel industry. In 1992 the union merged with the Amalgamated Footwear and Textile Workers' Union of Australia to form the Textile, Clothing and Footwear Union of Australia.

Further reading 

Ellem, Bradon (1989) In women's hands?:a history of clothing trades unionism in Australia Kensington, NSW, Australia: New South Wales University Press.

"My Life in the Ragtrade'Has just been published and tells the story of the once great clothing industry and retail stores we had in Australia. The history of stores and manufacturers is covered and some references were from Wilkipedia.

References

External links 
 tcfua.org.au The website of the Textile, Clothing and Footwear Union of Australia, the successor to the CATU.

Defunct trade unions of Australia
Clothing industry trade unions
Trade unions established in 1907
Trade unions disestablished in 1992
1907 establishments in Australia
1992 disestablishments in Australia